The 2011 Kremlin Cup was a tennis tournament played on indoor hard courts. It was the 22nd edition of the Kremlin Cup for the men (16th edition for the women) and was part of the ATP World Tour 250 Series of the 2011 ATP World Tour, and of the Premier Series of the 2011 WTA Tour. It was held at the Olympic Stadium in Moscow, Russia, from 15 October through 23 October 2011. Janko Tipsarević and Dominika Cibulková won the singles title.

ATP entrants

Seeds

 Seeds are based on the rankings of October 10, 2011

Other entrants
The following players received wildcards into the singles main draw:
  Evgeny Donskoy
  Teymuraz Gabashvili
  Andrey Kuznetsov

The following players have received the entry from the qualifying draw:

  Michael Berrer
  Jérémy Chardy
  Konstantin Kravchuk
  Dušan Lajović

WTA entrants

Seeds

 Seeds are based on the rankings of October 10, 2011

Other entrants
The following players received wildcards into the singles main draw:
  Alla Kudryavtseva
  Evgeniya Rodina
  Francesca Schiavone

The following players received entry from the qualifying draw:

  Alizé Cornet
  Ekaterina Ivanova
  Olga Savchuk
  Galina Voskoboeva

The following players received entry from a lucky loser spot:
  Arantxa Parra Santonja

Finals

Men's singles

 Janko Tipsarević defeated  Viktor Troicki, 6–4, 6–2
It was Tipsarevic's 2nd title of the year and career.

Women's singles

 Dominika Cibulková defeated  Kaia Kanepi, 3–6, 7–6(7–1), 7–5
It was Cibulkova's 1st career title.

Men's doubles

 František Čermák /  Filip Polášek defeated  Carlos Berlocq /  David Marrero, 6–3, 6–1

Women's doubles

 Vania King /  Yaroslava Shvedova defeated  Anastasia Rodionova /  Galina Voskoboeva, 7–6(7–3), 6–3

External links
 Official website

2011
2011 ATP World Tour
2011 WTA Tour
2011 in Russian tennis
2011 in Moscow
October 2011 sports events in Russia